Gulabpura railway station is a railway station in Bhilwara district, Rajasthan. Its code is GBP. It serves Gulabpura town. The station consists of a single platform. Passenger, Superfast trains halt here.

References

Railway stations in Bhilwara district
Ajmer railway division